The Great Southern Hotel & Theatre is an historic hotel and theater building in Downtown Columbus, Ohio. The building currently operates as the Westin Great Southern Columbus and the Southern Theatre.

It opened on September 21, 1896 and is the oldest surviving theater in Central Ohio and one of the oldest in the state of Ohio. The Southern Theatre is currently owned and operated as a home for live concerts, plays and opera by CAPA (the Columbus Association for the Performing Arts). CAPA also manages several other venues in Columbus including the Ohio, the Palace, and the Lincoln Theatres.

The building was listed on the National Register of Historic Places and Columbus Register of Historic Properties in 1982. It was also included in the South High Commercial Historic District, added to those registers in 1983 and 1987, respectively.

History

Design

Between 1889 and 1893 a series of fires destroyed five downtown Columbus theaters. As a result, a group of businessmen decided to develop a new hotel and theater with modern construction and safety features on the southern edge of downtown. The building was called "The Great Southern Fireproof Hotel and Opera House", and was designed by the local architectural firm of Dauben, Krumm, and Riebel. Construction began in 1894. Both the theater and the hotel were constructed of "fireproof" tile, brick, iron, steel, and concrete.

The theater's auditorium design was progressive for its day and was reminiscent of Louis H. Sullivan's 1891 Schiller Theatre in Chicago. From the proscenium opening, a series of concentric arches dotted with incandescent electric lights radiate into the house, resulting in superior lighting and excellent acoustics. Built to be self-sufficient, the theater, one of the first commercial buildings in Columbus to use electricity, generated its own power. Additionally, the building had three wells in the basement, from which it produced its own water supply. The theatre currently seats 933 and is an intimate "jewel box" type theater with two balconies.

In 1982, the Great Southern was added to the National Register of Historic Places.

Theater use

The Great Southern Theatre originally hosted theatrical touring productions. Sarah Bernhardt played in the theater in its first two decades. In the 1910s and 1920s the theater, now called the Southern, featured first run silent films and live vaudeville. From the 1930s on, the Southern was a popular home for second-run double features. In the 1970s the theater briefly returned to first run fare as the Towne Cinema, showing black exploitation movies. Throughout the 1970s the Southern also hosted a weekly live Country Music Jamboree, sponsored by local radio station WMNI.

The theater closed in 1979 and in 1986 was acquired by CAPA. After sitting empty for nearly two decades, the Southern was completely restored by CAPA in 1997-98 during an extensive 14-month rebuilding process. The newly restored Southern Theatre reopened on September 26, 1998. The Southern Theatre is now featured on many of Columbus's architectural tours.

See also
 List of concert halls
 National Register of Historic Places listings in Columbus, Ohio

References

External links

Westin Great Southern Columbus
The Southern Theatre

Theatres completed in 1896
Concert halls in Ohio
Culture of Columbus, Ohio
Theatres on the National Register of Historic Places in Ohio
Theatres in Columbus, Ohio
Colonial Revival architecture in Ohio
National Register of Historic Places in Columbus, Ohio
Buildings in downtown Columbus, Ohio
Columbus Register properties
Hotel buildings on the National Register of Historic Places in Ohio
Hotels in Columbus, Ohio
Yost and Packard buildings
Individually listed contributing properties to historic districts on the National Register in Ohio
High Street (Columbus, Ohio)
Historic district contributing properties in Columbus, Ohio